Titas Zia is a Bangladeshi film actor. He won Bangladesh National Film Award for Best Actor for his role in the film Mrittika Maya (2013).

References

External links
 

Living people
Bangladeshi male film actors
Best Actor National Film Award (Bangladesh) winners
Year of birth missing (living people)